Dal bhat (dail bhat / ডালি ভাত dali bhat) is a traditional meal from the Indian subcontinent, popular in many areas of Nepal, India, Pakistan, Bangladesh. It consists of steamed rice and a cooked lentil  or other pulses stew called dal. It is a staple food in these countries. Bhat or chawal means "boiled rice" in a number of Indo-Aryan languages.

At higher elevations in Nepal, above , where rice does not grow well, other grains such as maize, buckwheat, barley or millet may be substituted in a cooked preparation called dhindo or atho in Nepal.  Bhat may be supplemented with roti in Nepal (rounds of unleavened bread).

Dal may be cooked with onion, garlic, ginger, chili, tomatoes, or tamarind, in addition to lentils or beans.  It always contains herbs and spices such as coriander, garam masala, cumin, and turmeric. Recipes vary by season, locality, ethnic group and family.

Dal bhat is often served with vegetable tarkari or torkari ( in Hindi, তরকারি in Bengali) – a mix of available seasonal vegetables. It is also called dal bhat tarkari (दाल भात तरकारी) in Nepali and Bengali (ডাল ভাত তরকারি). A small portion of  pickle (called achar or loncha) is sometimes included. In Bengal (West Bengal and Bangladesh) dal bhat may accompany machh bhaja (মাছ ভাজা - fried fish).

See also 

 Assamese cuisine
 Awadhi cuisine
 Bengali cuisine
 Bhojpuri cuisine
 Bihari cuisine
 Caribbean cuisine
 Fijian cuisine
 Gujarati cuisine
 Indian cuisine
 Marathi cuisine
 Nepalese cuisine
 Odia cuisine
 Sikkimese cuisine
 Trinidad and Tobago cuisine

References

External links 
 Dal Bhat recipe 
 

Bangladeshi rice dishes
Nepalese cuisine
Bhutanese cuisine
Indian rice dishes
Indian legume dishes
Gujarati cuisine
Bengali cuisine
Pakistani cuisine
Sri Lankan cuisine
Kutchi cuisine
Indo-Caribbean cuisine
Fijian cuisine